Lyceum No. 1533 "LIT" (also known as Information Technology Lyceum) — school in Moscow established in 1991 and providing education in Information technology specialization. Since 1992 LIT is a UNESCO associated school. Lyceum is one of the leading schools in Russia.

References 

Education in Moscow